Ian Spence may refer to:

 Ian Spence (footballer), Scottish former football player and manager
 Ian Spence (psychologist) (born 1944), Canadian psychologist
 Ian Spence (actor)
 Ian Spence (software engineer) (born 1961), American software engineer